Jeremias Nicolas Ponce (born 3 July 1996) is an Argentinian professional boxer.

Professional boxing career
Ponce made his professional debut against Jesus David Barraza on 4 September 2015. He won the fight by a third-round knockout. Ponce amassed a 13–0 record during the next two years, before being booked to fight Martin Ariel Ruiz for his first professional title, the vacant WBA Fedebol welterweight belt, on 15 December 2017. Ponce captured the vacant title with a first-round knockout of Ruiz. Two months later, on 14 February 2018, Ponce faced Francesco Lomasto for the vacant IBF Inter-Continental super lightweight title. He won the fight by a ninth-round technical knockout. Ponce made his first WBA Fedebol title defense against Martin Severo on 14 April 2018. He won the fight by a second-round technical knockout.

Ponce challenged the reigning Argentinian super lightweight champion Damian Leonardo Yapur on 16 June 2018. He won the fight by a ninth-round knockout, successfully capturing his third professional title. Ponce made his second WBA welterweight title defense against Humberto Santos Mamani on 21 September 2018. He won the fight by a third-round technical knockout. Ponce made his first Argentinian super lightweight title defense against Miguel Cesario Antin on 21 December 2018. He made quick work of his opponent, winning the fight by a first-round technical knockout.

Ponce was booked to face the reigning South American super lightweight titleholder Leonardo Fabio Amitrano on 27 April 2019. He won the fight by split decision. On 14 September 2019, Ponce faced Rico Mueller for the vacant IBO super lightweight title. He won the fight by majority decision.

He defeated Lewis Ritson to become the mandatory IBF world title challenger.  However, the title fight is likely to be delayed if it occurs as the IBF champion Josh Taylor is unified champion and therefore has other mandatory obiligations with other sanctioning bodies before fighting Ponce. As Josh Taylor was scheduled to defend his titles against Jack Catterall, Ponce opted to face Michel Marcano in a stay-busy fight on 20 November 2021. He won the fight by a second-round knockout.

Professional boxing record

References

External links

Living people
Argentine male boxers
Light-welterweight boxers
1996 births
Boxers from Buenos Aires